Mikod (died after 1186) was a Hungarian prelate in the 12th century, who served as Bishop of Győr from 1176 until his death.

Career
Mikod (also Mikud, Micudinus or Mendinus) was plausibly born into the gens (clan) Kökényesradnót, which possessed landholdings in the southeastern part of Nógrád County. It is presumable that his uncle was Kökényes (Kuknis), the Archbishop of Esztergom around 1150. Under his patronage, Mikod attended the University of Paris. In France, he became acquainted with the Premonstratensians of Lotharingia.

Returning Hungary, Mikod became the Provost of Székesfehérvár sometime in the 1160s. In this capacity, he founded the Premonstratensian Abbey of Garáb in Nógrád County prior to 1171. It was dedicated to St. Hubertus. This wast the earliest non-royal Premonstratensian monastery in the Kingdom of Hungary. Mikod invited friars from Riéval Abbey in Upper Lotharingia. Charters of Pope Alexander III in 1171 and 1179 refer to Garáb as a dependent territory of Riéval Abbey.

Mikod was elected Bishop of Győr in 1176, succeeding Andrew. During the summer of 1176, the newly elected Archbishop Andrew led a Hungarian ecclesiastical delegation to Győr, also including bishop-elect Mikod, the newly elected provost Gregory of Székesfehérvár and Raynald, Abbot of Pannonhalma. They had assistated papal legate Walter, Bishop of Albano there, who was sent to the region to resolve the conflict between Holy Roman Emperor Frederick Barbarossa and Adalbert, Archbishop of Salzburg.

References

Sources

 
 
 

1180s deaths
12th-century Hungarian people
12th-century Roman Catholic bishops in Hungary
University of Paris alumni
Bishops of Győr
Kökényesradnót (genus)
Founders of Christian monasteries